CIT or cit may refer to:

Organizations
 Center for Information Technology, of the US government
 CIT Group, an American banking and financial services company
 Compagnia Italiana Turismo, an Italian travel agency
 Confederación Interamericana de Trabajadores, an inter-American trade union confederation
 Conflict Intelligence Team, open-source independent investigative organisation originating from Russia

Educational institutions
 CIT School, a senior secondary boys' school in Kolkata, West Bengal, India
 Canadian Institute of Technology, Tirana, Albania
 Canberra Institute of Technology
 Carnegie Institute of Technology, the former name for Carnegie Mellon University
 Cebu Institute of Technology – University, Cebu City, Philippines
 Central Institute of Technology, a corporate parent of the Wellington Institute of Technology in New Zealand
 Changchun Institute of Technology, Jilin, China
 Changshu Institute of Technology, Jiangsu, China
 Chiba Institute of Technology, Japan
 Chungyu Institute of Technology, Keelung, Taiwan
 Coimbatore Institute of Technology, India
 Cork Institute of Technology, Ireland
 Chartered Institute of Transport, London
 California Institute of Technology (Caltech), Pasadena, California, United States

Places 
 Çit, Kemaliye
 Çit, Taşköprü, a village in Turkey

Science and medicine
 Canine infectious tracheobronchitis or "kennel cough"
 β-CIT ( RTI-55), phenyltropane-based psychostimulant
 CIT (gene), citron kinase
 CIT Program Tumor Identity Cards, a programme for characterising tumours
 Collagen induction therapy, an aesthetic medical procedure

Transport infrastructure
 Chislehurst railway station (National Rail station code CIT)
 Shymkent International Airport (IATA: CIT)

Other uses
 Cash-in-transit, the physical transfer of banknotes, coins, credit cards and items of value
 Cit (consciousness), Sanskrit for consciousness or awareness; alternately spelled chit
 citation
 Closed inflatable trampoline
 CollegeInsider.com Postseason Tournament, in basketball
  Corporate Income Tax 
 Counselor-in-Training, at a summer camp
 Crisis intervention training
 Critical incident technique
 Customer interaction tracker

See also